Moon Landing is the fourth studio album by the British singer-songwriter James Blunt, released on 18 October 2013 through Custard Records and Atlantic Records. The album is the follow-up to 2010's Some Kind of Trouble, making it Blunt's first new material in three years. The album features production from the likes of Tom Rothrock, Steve Mac, Guy Chambers and Steve Robson, and was executively produced by Tom Rothrock, who worked with Blunt on 2004's Back to Bedlam.

The first single from the album "Bonfire Heart" debuted at number six before peaking at number four the following week in the UK Singles Chart. The single peaked at one in Germany, Switzerland and Austria. It was in the top 10 in different countries all over the world.

On 10 November 2014, the album was re-released as Moon Landing – Apollo Edition, with five bonus tracks.

Background
On 11 July 2013, Blunt announced that he had finished recording his fourth studio album, entitled Moon Landing. The album features production from Back to Bedlam producer Tom Rothrock.

The lead single, "Bonfire Heart", was released on 4 October 2013, the song is fueled by just acoustic guitars and a stomping kick drum, reflects Blunt's newly stripped-down take. The song "Miss America" is a tribute to Whitney Houston, as revealed by Blunt in an acoustic video of the song on his YouTube channel. Blunt's return to music received widespread press coverage, after an error in the mailing system lead to the link to "Bonfire Heart" being e-mailed to a large number of e-mail accounts in the United Kingdom.
Unplugged versions of the songs called "Miss America" and "Face the Sun", and the lyrics video of the song "Satellites" were unveiled on YouTube.

On 16 September 2014, Blunt confirmed on his official Instagram account that Moon Landing would be re-released on November that same year. That new version of the album will be named Moon Landing - Apollo Edition and will contain 19 tracks: the 11 of the original disc, plus the 3 bonus tracks of the album's deluxe version (Telephone, Kiss This Love Goodbye and Hollywood) and five new tracks (Smoke Signals, When I Find Love Again, Breathe, Trail of Broken Hearts and Working It Out). The new track When I Find Love Again was released as a single that same day, after being played in BBC's Radio 2 for the first time ever. This new version of the album will also contain a 19-track live DVD recorded during Blunt's performance in the 2014 edition of the Paléo Festival.

Critical reception

Moon Landing received mixed reviews from music critics.

Track listing
The album is available in three editions – a standard 11-track release, deluxe 14-track release and super deluxe box set, containing a bonus DVD, handwritten lyric booklet and special photographs from the making of the album, with the first five hundred to be signed by James himself. The Japanese edition also contains three exclusive bonus recordings. On 21 October 2014, the album was re-released as Moon Landing: Apollo Edition with five additional tracks. In the United States, the new tracks were released as part of the Smoke Signals EP on 15 December 2014.

Personnel
James Blunt – lead vocals, guitars, piano, keyboards
Sasha Krivtsov – bass
Charlie Paxson – drums, percussion
John Nau – keyboards
Matt Chait – guitars
Tom Rothrock - guitars, keyboards
Mike Tarantino – engineering
Smith Carlson - Engineer

Charts

Weekly charts

Year-end charts

Certifications

Release history

References

2013 albums
James Blunt albums
Albums produced by Tom Rothrock
Albums produced by Ryan Tedder